Playmates is the 16th book in Robert B. Parker's  Spenser series and first published in 1989.

Spenser investigates a point shaving scheme involving the Taft University basketball team.

References

Spenser (novel series)
Taft College